Peter Fich Christiansen (born 4 April 1941) is a retired Danish rower who had his best achievements in the coxless pairs. In this event, he won two European medals, in 1964 and 1965 together with Hans Jørgen Boye; they also finished in fifth place at the 1964 Summer Olympics. At the 1968 Games, Christiansen rowed with Ib Larsen and won a bronze medal. Four years later, he competed in the coxless fours and ended in sixth place.

References

1941 births
Living people
Danish male rowers
Olympic rowers of Denmark
Rowers at the 1964 Summer Olympics
Rowers at the 1968 Summer Olympics
Rowers at the 1972 Summer Olympics
Olympic bronze medalists for Denmark
Olympic medalists in rowing
Medalists at the 1968 Summer Olympics
European Rowing Championships medalists
Sportspeople from Frederiksberg